Noenieput is a small town in the Kalahari Desert in ZF Mgcawu District Municipality in the Northern Cape province of South Africa.

The town is located approximately 14 kilometres east of the South African border with Namibia. A police station is located in the town.

References

Populated places in the Dawid Kruiper Local Municipality